Mathieu Bertrand (born December 28, 1977) is a former Canadian football fullback who played for the Edmonton Eskimos of the Canadian Football League (CFL). He was drafted 44th overall in the 2003 CFL Draft by the Montreal Alouettes, but returned to school following his release in training camp. He was signed by the Eskimos on January 24, 2004, and won a Grey Cup championship with the team in 2005. He played CIS football as a quarterback for the Laval Rouge et Or.

External links
 Edmonton Eskimos' roster
 CFLPA player profile

 http://www.quebechebdo.com/sports/football/2016/10/6/mathieu-bertrand-du-sang-rouge-et-or-4658075.html

1977 births
Living people
Edmonton Elks players
Laval Rouge et Or football players
People from Chambly, Quebec
Players of Canadian football from Quebec